"New Year's Day" is a song by Irish rock band U2. It is the third track on their 1983 album War and was released as the album's lead single in January 1983. With lyrics written about the Polish Solidarity movement, "New Year's Day" is driven by Adam Clayton's distinctive bassline and the Edge's piano and guitar playing. It was the band's first UK hit single, peaking at number 10, and was also their first international hit, reaching for number 9 in Norway, number 11 on the Dutch Top 40, number 17 in Sweden, and number 53 on the Billboard Hot 100 in the United States, becoming the band's first single to chart in the US.

In 2004, the song was ranked 427th on Rolling Stones list of "The 500 Greatest Songs of All Time". It was also included in the Pitchfork 500.

The UK cover features a photograph of Peter Rowen, who grew up near the group's lead vocalist Bono in Ireland.

Writing and composition
The lyric had its origins in a love song from Bono to his wife, but was subsequently reshaped and inspired by the Polish Solidarity movement. The bassline stemmed from bassist Adam Clayton trying to figure out the chords to the Visage song "Fade to Grey" during a soundcheck.

In 1983, Bono said of the song, "It would be stupid to start drawing up battle lines, but I think the fact that 'New Year's Day' made the Top Ten indicated a disillusionment among record buyers. I don't think 'New Year's Day' was a pop single, certainly not in the way that Mickie Most might define a pop single as something that lasts three minutes and three weeks in the chart. I don't think we could have written that kind of song."

Music video
The video was one of their first to see heavy rotation on MTV. It was filmed in Sälen and Mora, Sweden in December 1982 and directed by Meiert Avis. The band only appeared in the performance scenes of the video as it was filmed in the dead of the Swedish winter. U2 guitarist Edge said in the official U2 biography that the four people riding on horseback in the video that appeared to be the four U2 members were in fact four Swedish teenage girls disguised as the members of U2 riding on horseback with masks over their faces, because the band were frozen from shooting the video in sub-freezing temperatures the day before. Their biography states that Bono refused to wear any headgear despite the cold weather and had a lot of trouble mouthing the lyrics. The video also features footage of Soviet troops advancing in winter during World War II.

U2 allowed free-of-charge use of this song in a spot prepared by the European Commission. This clip published on YouTube shows a transformation of Poland in the last 20 years mixed with short scenes from today's Warsaw seen from a perspective of a 20-year-old woman.

Live performances
"New Year's Day", U2's seventh-most frequently performed live song, has been a standard on every U2 tour since its debut on 1 December 1982 at the first show of the War Tour's Pre-Tour. However, the Innocence + Experience tour only featured three performances of the song.

In concert, the Edge switches between piano and guitar during the song. In 1980s performances, he used a Fender Stratocaster and a Yamaha CP70 electric grand piano. During the 1990s and 2000s, he has alternated between a Gibson Les Paul Custom and Les Paul Standard. The Les Paul the Edge used to write this song was sold for charity. Until the Elevation Tour, Clayton normally used a chorus effect on his bass guitar for this song live. In the Top of the Pops performance, Bono is seen playing guitar.

"New Year's Day" has appeared on many of U2's concert video releases including 1983's U2 Live at Red Rocks: Under a Blood Red Sky, Zoo TV: Live from Sydney, PopMart: Live from Mexico City, U2 Go Home: Live from Slane Castle, Vertigo 2005: Live from Chicago, Live from Paris, and U2 3D.

U2 has never performed in concert the B-side of "New Year's Day", "Treasure (Whatever Happened to Pete the Chop?)", although they played an early version known simply as "Pete the Chop" at some concerts in 1980.

When the band played "New Year's Day" during the Vertigo Tour performance at Silesian Stadium in Poland, the crowd surprised the band when the lower sections waved red-coloured items while other sections waved white, creating the Polish flag. This was repeated during the U2 360° Tour at the same venue.

Reception
In 2004, Rolling Stone placed the song at number 427 on its list of "The 500 Greatest Songs of All Time"; the song was re-ranked to 435th on the magazine's 2010 version of the list. The song was also included in the Pitchfork 500.

Cash Box said in its contemporary review of the single that "an agitated yet steady rhythm lays the foundation for this stark, AOR-slanted single by a thinking man’s rock 'n' roll band."

Formats and track listings

Charts

Weekly charts

Year-end charts

Musique remix

In May 2001, dance act Musique released a remix of the song, "New Year's Dub". The remix charted in some European countries, including in the UK and in Ireland, where it peaked at no. 15 and no. 13, respectively. It also charted in Australia, where it peaked at no. 74.

Track listings

Weekly charts

Year-end charts

See also
List of cover versions of U2 songs – New Year's Day

References

1983 singles
1983 songs
U2 songs
Irish new wave songs
Island Records singles
CBS Records singles
New Year songs
Music videos directed by Meiert Avis
Solidarity (Polish trade union)
Song recordings produced by Steve Lillywhite
Songs written by Adam Clayton
Songs written by Bono
Songs written by the Edge
Songs written by Larry Mullen Jr.